Grant Golden (born January 15, 1998) is an American professional basketball player for the Grand Rapids Gold of the NBA G League. He played college basketball for the Richmond Spiders of the Atlantic 10 Conference.

High school career
After averaging 18.1 points and 7.7 rebounds per game as a sophomore for Sherando High School in Stephens City, Virginia, Golden transferred to St. James School in Hagerstown, Maryland. He suffered a stress fracture in his right foot before his junior season, before breaking his left ankle in his second game and missing the rest of the season. As a senior at St. James, Golden averaged 17.2 points, 10.3 rebounds and 3.5 assists per game, leading his team to the Mid-Atlantic Athletic Conference title. He was named Washington County Co-Player of the Year by The Herald-Mail. He committed to playing college basketball for Richmond over offers from James Madison, San Diego, Wofford and George Washington.

College career
On December 17, 2016, during a game against Texas Tech, Golden collapsed and was briefly unconscious due to an irregular heartbeat. He underwent a cardiac ablation procedure to correct his heart rhythm. Golden missed the remainder of the season, after playing nine games, and was granted a medical redshirt by the National Collegiate Athletic Association. As a redshirt freshman, he averaged a team-high 15.6 points and 6.7 rebounds per game, earning Third Team All-Atlantic 10 and Atlantic 10 All-Rookie Team honors. Golden scored 498 points, breaking the program freshman scoring record. On November 21, 2018, he posted a career-high 33 points and nine rebounds in a 68–66 loss to Wyoming. As a sophomore, he averaged 17.2 points, 7.1 rebounds and 3.5 assists per game and was named to the Third Team All-Atlantic 10 for a second time. On January 18, 2020, Golden scored a season-high 25 points in a 97–87 win against George Mason. In his junior season, Golden averaged 13.4 points, 6.9 rebounds and 3.4 assists per game, earning Second Team All-Atlantic 10 honors. He led Richmond to a program-record 14 conference wins. Golden declared for the 2020 NBA draft before withdrawing his name and opting to return to Richmond.

On January 18, 2022, Golden passed the 2,000 career point mark in a win against Fordham. Golden collected his 1,000th rebound in the Spiders' 2022 Atlantic 10 tournament semifinal win over Dayton.

Professional career

Grand Rapids Gold (2022–present)
Following his career at Richmond, Golden signed with the Atlanta Hawks for the 2022 NBA Summer League season. Golden then signed an Exhibit 10 contract with the Denver Nuggets for the NBA preseason. Golden was later waived and then re-signed a few days later by the Nuggets. On November 4, 2022, Golden was named to the opening night roster for the Grand Rapids Gold.

Career statistics

College

|-
| style="text-align:left;"| 2016–17
| style="text-align:left;"| Richmond
| 9 || 0 || 7.6 || .350 || .200 || .333 || 2.0 || .9 || .0 || .2 || 2.0
|-
| style="text-align:left;"| 2017–18
| style="text-align:left;"| Richmond
| 32 || 32 || 30.7 || .498 || .275 || .625 || 6.7 || 2.2 || .6 || 1.2 || 15.6
|-
| style="text-align:left;"| 2018–19
| style="text-align:left;"| Richmond
| 33 || 33 || 31.4 || .503 || .296 || .657 || 7.1 || 3.5 || .5 || 1.1 || 17.2
|-
| style="text-align:left;"| 2019–20
| style="text-align:left;"| Richmond
| 29 || 29 || 26.0 || .524 || .263 || .713 || 6.9 || 3.4 || .6 || .9 || 13.4
|-
| style="text-align:left;"| 2020–21
| style="text-align:left;"| Richmond
| 21 || 21 || 27.3 || .562 || .500 || .667 || 6.0 || 3.5 || .6 || .5 || 12.7
|-
| style="text-align:left;"| 2021–22
| style="text-align:left;"| Richmond
| 37 || 37 || 27.6 || .506 || .280 || .706 || 6.0 || 2.9 || .4 || .5 || 13.7
|- class="sortbottom"
| style="text-align:center;" colspan="2"| Career
| 161 || 152 || 27.5 || .511 || .295 || .665 || 6.3 || 3.0 || .5 || .8 || 14.0

Personal life
Golden's younger brother, Bryce, played four years of college basketball for Butler before transferring to Loyola for his final season. His father, Craig, stands 6 ft 10 in (2.08 m) and played college basketball for Fairfield and Hartford.

See also
 List of NCAA Division I men's basketball players with 2,000 points and 1,000 rebounds
 List of NCAA Division I men's basketball career games played leaders

References

External links
Richmond Spiders bio

1998 births
Living people
American men's basketball players
Basketball players from Virginia
Grand Rapids Gold players
People from Winchester, Virginia
Power forwards (basketball)
Richmond Spiders men's basketball players